The Anghan (Kamantan) are found in  Zanngo Kataf and Kachia Local Government Area of  Kaduna state, in the Middle Belt area of Nigeria.

Distribution
The Anghan people are mainly found in Zangon Kataf Local Government Area of southern Kaduna State, Nigeria. The Anghan alongside the Bakulu are the smaller of the groups in the local government with each having just a ward only despite their numbers, decried Rev. Fr. Matthew Kukah.

Religion
About 80% of the Anghans are Christian adherents (with Roman Catholics making up 80.0%, Protestants 10.0% and Independent 10.0%), while the other 18.0% of the population is said to practice traditional religion and possibly a few (less than 2%) are muslims.

Language 
Kamantan (Anghan)

Kingship Stool
The Anghan people are primarily found in Anghan Chiefdom and its rulers are known as Ngbiar. The current monarch is His Royal Highness (HRH) Ngbiar Adamu Alkali, Ngbiar Anghan. The chiefdom headquarters is at Fadan Kamantan, Zangon Kataf Local Government Area, Kaduna State.

References

Kaduna
Ethnic groups in Nigeria
People from Kaduna State